Arakawa is a Japanese surname. Notable people with the surname include:

Adele Arakawa (born 1958), American evening news anchor
Akio Arakawa (1927–2021), climate scientist
Alan Arakawa (born 1951), American local politician, mayor of Maui, Hawaii
, Japanese long jumper
, Japanese women's footballer
, Japanese water polo player
, Japanese manga artist
, Japanese baseball player
, Japanese voice actress
, Japanese businessman, former president of Nintendo of America
Mitsu Arakawa (1927–1997), American professional wrestler
, Japanese manga artist
, Japanese screenwriter
, Japanese boxer
, Japanese linguist
, Japanese figure skater
, Japanese artist and architect
, Japanese karateka
, Japanese composer
, Japanese potter
, Japanese physicist
, Japanese actor
, Japanese baseball player

Japanese-language surnames